Zagreb attack may refer to:

Sabotage at the General Post Office in Zagreb, in 1941
Bombing of Zagreb in World War II, in 1944 & 1945
Bombing of Banski dvori, in October 1991
Murder of the Zec family, in December 1991
Zagreb rocket attacks, in 1995
Assassination of Ivo Pukanić, in 2008
Kajzerica shooting, in 2019
2020 Zagreb shooting